Millennium Peak is a peak rising to about  on the northeast slope of Mount Erebus, Ross Island, Antarctica,  east-northeast of the Erebus summit. It was so named by the Advisory Committee on Antarctic Names in the millennium year 2000.

References

Mountains of Ross Island